Nastia (or Nastya) Gorshkova (born 13 April 1986 in Sergiyev Posad, Moscow Oblast, Russia) is a Russian fashion model. Her runway debut was held at the Lanvin spring/summer 2004 fashion show as part of Paris Fashion Week.  The last time appeared on the runway for the Jean Paul Gaultier Haute Couture fall/winter 2007-08 fashion show.

Nastya has been on the covers of Flair, Glamour (Germany), The Sunday Telegraph Magazin and Vogue Russia.

References

External links
Nastia Gorshkova at the FMD.
Nastia Gorshkova at Supermodels.nl.

1986 births
Living people
Russian female models
People from Sergiyev Posad